Remco Eric Pielstroom (born 8 April 1965 in Amsterdam) is a former water polo player from the Netherlands, who participated in two Summer Olympics. In 1984 he finished in sixth position with the Dutch team, eight years later in Barcelona Pielstroom gained the ninth spot in the final rankings with Holland.

References
 Dutch Olympic Committee

1965 births
Living people
Dutch male water polo players
Olympic water polo players of the Netherlands
Water polo players at the 1984 Summer Olympics
Water polo players at the 1992 Summer Olympics
Water polo players from Amsterdam
20th-century Dutch people